William Hetherington Shield (July 12, 1878 – April 15, 1939) was a Canadian provincial politician from Alberta. He served as a member of the Legislative Assembly of Alberta from 1921 to 1935 sitting with the United Farmers caucus in government.

Political career
Shield ran for a seat to the Alberta Legislature in the 1921 Alberta general election. He stood as a United Farmers candidate in the electoral district of Macloed against incumbent George Skelding. The race was very close with Shield defeating Skelding by 107 votes.

Shield ran for a second term in the 1926 Alberta general election. He faced two other candidates in a very close contest. Shield hung on to win in the second vote count over Liberal candidate John McDonald.

The 1930 Alberta general election saw Shield run in a two way race against McDonald who had become Liberal leader. Shield managed to win the straight fight with a greatly improved popular vote more than tripled from the previous election sending McDonald to defeat.

Shield ran for a fourth term in the 1935 Alberta general election but was defeated finishing a distant second in the three way race to Social Credit candidate James Hartley.

References

External links
Legislative Assembly of Alberta Members Listing

United Farmers of Alberta MLAs
1878 births
1939 deaths